The 1946 Springfield Gymnasts football team, sometimes also referred to as the Maroons, was an American football team that represented Springfield College as an independent during the 1946 college football season.  In their first season under head coach Ossie Solem, the Gymnasts compiled a 4–4 record and outscored opponents by a total of 110 to 69.

The team played its home games at Pratt Field in Springfield, Massachusetts. It was the program's first season since 1942, having gone on hiatus during World War II.

Solem had previously coached for three major football programs, Drake (1921–1931), Iowa (1932–1936), and Syracuse (1937–1945).

Schedule

References

Springfield
Springfield Pride football seasons
Springfield Gymnasts football